Piario is a comune (municipality) in the Province of Bergamo in the Italian region of Lombardy, located about  northeast of Milan and about  northeast of Bergamo.

The municipality of Piario contains the frazione (subdivision) Groppino.

Piario borders the following municipalities: Clusone, Parre, Villa d'Ogna.

Demographic evolution

References

External links
 www.comune.piario.bg.it